The Alternative for Bulgarian Revival (АБВ) is a centre-left political party in Bulgaria. ABV, the romanized party's initials in Bulgarian, are the first three letters of the Cyrillic alphabet, equivalent to ABC. A social-democratic party, it holds pro-European and "quasi-nationalist social conservative" views.

History
The party was founded and is led by Georgi Parvanov, who was the president of Bulgaria from 2002 to 2012, as a splinter from the Bulgarian Socialist Party. In the May 2014 European Parliament election in Bulgaria, the party received 4% of the vote, failing to elect any Member of the European Parliament. In the 2014 Bulgarian parliamentary election, the party received 4.15% of the vote and 11 seats in the National Assembly.

List of chairmen

Election results

References

External links
 Official website 

Nationalist parties in Bulgaria
Political parties established in 2014
Social democratic parties in Bulgaria
2014 establishments in Bulgaria